The Prahar Janshakti Party, abbreviated as, PJP is an Indian state-level political party in Maharashtra, India. PJP is a recognized state political party. PJP was founded in 1999 by Omprakash Babarao Kadu with the ideology of Farmers Development.

References

Political parties in Maharashtra
Political parties established in 1999
1999 establishments in Maharashtra